The Hanoi Opera House, or the Grand Opera House is an opera house in central Hanoi, Vietnam. It was erected by the French colonial administration between 1901 and 1911. Hanoi Opera House is one of three opera houses that the French built during their time in Indochina, the others are Haiphong Opera House and Municipal Theatre in Ho Chi Minh city.

Building

It was modeled on the Palais Garnier, the older of Paris's two opera houses, and is considered to be one of the architectural landmarks of Hanoi. The main architectural style of the Opera House is Neoclassicism. As mentioned before, Hanoi Opera House was modeled on the Palais Garnier but with a smaller scale and using materials that are suitable with the environment. After the departure of the French the opera house became the scene for several political events. as well as the scene of street fighting during the fight for Hanoi.

The Hanoi Opera House provides the names for the neighboring Hilton Hanoi Opera Hotel which opened in 1999, as well as for the MGallery Hotel de l'Opera Hanoi, which opened in 2011.  For historical reasons associated with the Vietnam war, the Hilton Hanoi Opera Hotel was not named the Hanoi Hilton.

The Opera Company

Colonial period
The opera house is described in the memoirs of Blanche Arral who performed in the new Hanoi Opera House in 1902 while waiting for the 1902 Exposition of Hanoi to open. The opera had depended on touring artists performing French and Italian repertoire during the colonial period for a mainly French audience.

The Vietnam National Opera and Ballet (VNOB)
After the departure of the French the building was used for Vietnamese plays and musicals. The return of Western opera, and the first major non-French or Italian opera, was a performance of Tchaikovsky's Eugene Onegin organised under Vietnam-Soviet cultural auspices in 1960, where the Russian vocal coach selected an untrained singer Quý Dương as a fit for the baritone title role.

Today the orchestra of the opera overlaps with the Vietnam National Symphony Orchestra, and calls on the Hanoi Philharmonic Orchestra of the Hanoi Conservatory. Famous singers of the company include the Tchaikovsky Conservatory-trained soprano Lê Dung, the youngest ever person to be awarded People's Artist of Vietnam in 1993.

The Opera has seen many premieres of operas and musicals by Vietnamese composers. The operas of Đỗ Nhuận - Cô Sao ('Miss Sao') 1965, Người tạc tượng ('The Sculptor') 1971 and Nguyễn Trãi 1980, the works of Lưu Hữu Phước and the choral works of film composer Đặng Hữu Phúc. As well as works by returning emigre composers such as Nguyễn Thiên Đạo, a pupil of Messiaen in Paris.

The National Ballet is also part of the Opera House company and stages Western classics such as Swan Lake as well as traditional and modern Vietnamese dance productions.

Gallery

See also
 Grand Palais (Hanoi)

Smaller French theaters built around the same time:
 Saigon Opera House 
 Haiphong Opera House

References
Notes

Sources
Arral, Blanche (Trans: Ira Glackens; Ed: William R. Moran), Extraordinary Operatic Adventures of Blanche Arral.  Milwaukee, WI: Amadeus Press, 2002

External links

Performance at Hanoi Opera House
Hanoi Opera House – A Witness of Vietnamese History

Historical sites in Hanoi
Culture of Hanoi
Opera houses in Vietnam
Buildings and structures in Hanoi
French colonial architecture in Vietnam
Tourist attractions in Hanoi
Theatres completed in 1901
Event venues established in 1901